Oulad M'Rah is a town in Settat Province, Casablanca-Settat, Morocco. According to the 2004 census it has a population of 9,166.

References

Populated places in Settat Province
[[Category:Municipalities of Morocco